EPSC can stand for:
 Elasto-Plastic Self-Consistent Modeling
 Escola Politècnica Superior de Castelldefels
 European Planetary Science Congress
 European Political Strategy Centre
 Excitatory postsynaptic current
 The European Process Safety Centre
 ICAO code of Szczecin-Goleniów "Solidarność" Airport in Poland
 Early peak systolic compliance
 European Poker Sport Championship
 Erosion Prevention & Sediment Control